

List of Ambassadors
Ehud Eitam 1998 - 2001
Rivka Cohen-Litant 2001 - 2004
Shabtai Tsur 2005 - 2008
Itzhak Gerberg 2008 - 2012
Yuval Fuchs 2012 - 2016
Shabtai Tsur 2016 -

References 

Georgia
Israel